Pseudocroesia is a genus of moths belonging to the subfamily Tortricinae of the family Tortricidae. It contains only one species, Pseudocroesia coronaria, which is found in China (Shansi).

See also
List of Tortricidae genera

References

 , 2005: World Catalogue of Insects vol. 5 Tortricidae.

External links
tortricidae.com

Tortricini
Monotypic moth genera
Taxa named by Józef Razowski
Moths of Asia
Tortricidae genera